The Internet Chess Club (ICC) is a commercial Internet chess server devoted to the play and discussion of chess and chess variants.  ICC had over 30,000 subscribing members in 2005. It was the first Internet chess server and was the largest pay to play chess server in 2005.

History
The first Internet chess server (ICS), programmed by Michael Moore and Richard Nash, was launched on 15 January 1992. Players logged in by telnet, and the board was displayed as ASCII text. Bugs in the server software allowed illegal moves, false checkmates etc. Over time more and more features were added to ICS, such as Elo ratings and a choice of graphical interfaces. The playing pool grew steadily, many of the server bugs were fixed, and players began to have higher expectations for stability.

Later on in 1992, Daniel Sleator (darooha) volunteered to take over as head programmer, and began a large overhaul of the server code. He addressed, among other issues, the frequent complaint that players would lose blitz games on time due to Internet lag. In 1994, he copyrighted the code, and began receiving purchase offers from companies wanting to commercialize the server. On 1 March 1995, Sleator announced his intentions to commercialize ICS, renaming it the Internet Chess Club, or ICC, and charging a yearly membership fee. The membership is free for players with a Grandmaster or International Master title.

Some programmers who had worked on the original ICS became unhappy with what they saw as the commoditization of their project. Led by Chris Petroff, they formed the Free Internet Chess Server (FICS), which to this day continues to allow everyone to access all features for free.

On 29 May 2007, the World Chess Network was bought by the Internet Chess Club. It was then merged with Chess Live, another Internet chess server acquired by Internet Chess Club from GamesParlor. The result of the acquisition and merger was the formation of World Chess Live, a new Internet chess server that merged features of both services. World Chess Live merged into, and become part of, the Internet Chess Club on 19 March 2012. For some years, the Spanish on-line chess portal JaqueMate.org had technological support provided by ICC. The portal closed on 30 April 2013 with members transferred to ICC.

Services available
ICC's core service is the facility to play chess games (and a number of chess variants) against other members and computers coupled with a rating system. ICC also offers many different types of tournaments. ICC recently partnered with the United States Chess Federation (USCF) to provide USCF rated online quick and blitz tournaments (these online ratings are separate from the USCF over-the-board quick and blitz rating systems apart from the initial seeding of the online quick and blitz ratings for unrated players). Members can also watch live broadcasts of tournaments with grandmaster commentary on Chess.FM, watch games involving titled players being played on ICC and challenge grandmasters in simultaneous exhibitions. The site also offers access to libraries of games, recorded lectures and private lessons (at additional cost).

Software
ICC provides the proprietary Windows BlitzIn software, currently at version 3.11, and the Dasher program, currently at version 1.5.8. There are other software front-ends which work with the ICC system including those for the Macintosh and iPad. Along with other major chess sites, ICC has sophisticated methods to detect computer cheating.

Criticism
The commercialisation of ICC was extensively criticised by users, particularly that Daniel Sleator was charging a subscription to use a system that had been developed by others. Following complaints by students, they were offered a 50% discount.

The security of the system was criticised in December 2005 with claims that communications between ICC and users could easily be read and that the timestamping could be defeated.

Internet Computer Chess Tournament
The Internet Computer Chess Tournament (CCT) was a chess tournament for computer chess programs held from 2000 to 2011. It was organised annually by the Internet Chess Club. The format was a Swiss system varying between 7 and 9 game rounds, with time controls (from CCT7 onwards) of 50 minutes and 3 second increments. The tournament was set to be completed in one weekend.

See also
List of Internet chess servers

References

Further reading

External links
 Official site

Internet chess servers
Chess websites
Companies based in Pittsburgh
Privately held companies based in Pennsylvania
Internet properties established in 1995
1995 establishments in the United States